ACT is a lossy ADPCM 8 kbit/s compressed audio format recorded by most Chinese MP3 and MP4 players with a recording function, and voice recorders.

Many models of recorder that use the ACT format do so only for their lowest-quality recording setting; if the quality setting is increased then a different format, typically WAV, is used, creating much larger files.

There are different versions of ACT; files produced by later devices could not  be read by any free standard audio player and converter software, only by the supplied MP3 utilities.

Decoding .act files

Using Windows
Devices which record in this format are usually supplied with an ACT to WAV converter program that runs under Microsoft Windows; the converter usually used can be downloaded as part of MP3 Player Utilities.
Konvertor (http://www.logipole.com/index.html) can play and convert the format too.

Using Linux
Linux command-line utility SoX supports .act files. The following command converts an .act file to another format:
sox -i -r8k -tima -c1 infile.act outfile

References

Audio codecs